Memphis-style barbecue is one of the four predominant regional styles of barbecue in the United States, the other three being Carolina, Kansas City, and Texas.  Like many southern varieties of barbecue, Memphis-style barbecue is mostly made using pork, usually ribs and shoulders, though many restaurants will still serve beef and chicken.   

Memphis-style barbecue is slow cooked in a pit and ribs can be prepared either "dry" or "wet". "Dry" ribs are covered with a dry rub consisting of salt and various spices before cooking and are normally eaten without sauce. "Wet" ribs are brushed with sauce before, during, and after cooking.  

Memphis-style barbecue has become well known due to the World Championship Barbecue Cooking Contest held each May, which has been listed in Guinness World Records as the largest pork barbecue contest in the world.
The event is regularly covered by national and international television networks such as The Food Network and the BBC and attracts over 100,000 visitors.  Many of Memphis' barbecue restaurants have become nationally known and can ship their products anywhere in the country overnight due to the proximity of FedEx's Memphis Superhub.

History

After World War II, barbecue became a viable commercial venture in Memphis. Small restaurants, known as "joints", began to open with a purpose-built pit for slow-cooking the meat. 

Many small neighborhood joints in low-income areas, such as Payne's, Leonard's and Interstate, have gained notoriety as they reflect the roots of Memphis barbecue. Many regional chains also developed from Memphis, including Tops, Neely's, and Corky's. 

As Memphis-style barbecue became more popular across the country, restaurants such as Corky's and The Rendezvous began shipping orders overnight to customers.

Notable establishments

Jim Neely's Interstate Bar-B-Que
Interstate Bar-B-Que was founded in 1978 by Jim Neely in a rundown grocery store in the low-income neighborhood of South Memphis. Though never a restaurateur, Neely learned how to slow cook ribs in a pit and created a secret sauce based on various local family recipes.  

Interstate rose to prominence as one of the premier barbecue restaurants in the city, and was featured nationally on The Food Network and The Travel Channel. Neely's brother and sister-in-law operate another location in Gardena, California. Interstate has been voted the #2 barbecue restaurant in America by People magazine.

Neely's
Jim Neely's four nephews, brothers Gaelin, Tony, Mark and Patrick, founded Neely's BBQ in Downtown Memphis in 1988, though it operates as a separate business from the other Neely's and does not carry the Interstate name.   In 2008, Pat Neely and his wife Gina debuted a cooking show on The Food Network called Down Home with the Neelys, which is a top ratings performer on the network.  The couple has also released a cookbook eponymous with their first show.  In 2012, the Neelys announced that they were permanently closing their Memphis-area restaurants.

Charlie Vergos' Rendezvous
Rendezvous was founded by Charlie Vergos in 1948 in a back alley of Downtown Memphis.  Originally the basement of his diner, Vergos discovered a coal chute and turned it into a barbecue pit. Eventually, Vergos converted his diner to a barbecue restaurant and moved the entrance from the street to the alley. 

Rendezvous is one of the older and more storied barbecue joints in Memphis due to its more than sixty years of operation and "hole-in-the-wall" atmosphere.  The Memphis City Council voted to name the alley where Rendezvous is located "Charlie Vergos' Rendezvous Alley", though the address remains 52 South 2nd Street.  

One of Rendezvous' signature dishes is a barbecue shrimp skillet which must be ordered a full day in advance.

Central BBQ
Central BBQ was founded in 2002 by partners Roger Sapp and Craig Blondis. Central BBQ has four locations in Memphis, with the most recent having opened in East Memphis in 2018. Central BBQ also has a food truck that caters to local events. 

Though a newcomer to Memphis' barbecue scene, Central BBQ has placed in the top 3 for barbecue categories in the Memphis Flyer's annual "Best Of Memphis" contest, as voted for by Memphis residents, every year since its inception. In 2011, Central placed first for "Best Barbecue", 2nd for "Best Ribs", and 3rd for "Best Hot Wings."

As of 2017, Central BBQ has 150 employees across 3 locations with plans to expand outside of Memphis.

Germantown Commissary
Germantown Commissary was a traditional country store for decades until 1981, when a new owner bought it and turned it into a barbecue restaurant. Noted for pork ribs and shoulders, Germantown Commissary has a broader menu as well. It was featured on "Food Paradise" that airs on the Travel Channel.

See also
Barbecue spaghetti
List of regional dishes of the United States

References

Culture of Memphis, Tennessee
Tennessee cuisine
Barbecue